Harunur Rashid is a Bangladeshi film director and writer. In 1976, he won the Bangladesh National Film Award for Best Director for the film Megher Onek Rong.

Filmography

Director
 Rupaban - 1992
 Gunai Bibi - 1985 
 Megher Onek Rong - 1976 
 Shuorani Duorani (assistant director) - 1968
 Kanchanmala (chief assistant director) - 1967
 Rupban (assistant director) - 1965

Writer
 Gunai Bibi - 1985
 Megher Onek Rong - 1976

Awards and nominations
National Film Awards

References

External links
 

Living people
Bangladeshi film directors
Best Director National Film Award (Bangladesh) winners
Year of birth missing (living people)
Place of birth missing (living people)